Kelly Fremon Craig (born January 1, 1981) is an American screenwriter, producer, and film director. She is known for directing, writing, and co-producing the 2016 coming-of-age dramedy The Edge of Seventeen.

Early life 
Fremon Craig was born in Whittier, California and graduated from UC Irvine with an English degree. When she was 13, she watched a lot of MTV, which sparked her interest in music videos. She stated that music videos were "like little short films". Spoken word or slam poetry was what Fremon Craig initially began writing.

Career

2000s
Fremon Craig started out by writing sketch comedy and spoken word poetry in college, then landed an internship in the film division of Immortal Entertainment, where she read her first film script and began to pursue screenwriting. She developed several screenplays during the 2000s, including a modern high school retelling of  Cyrano de Bergerac and a comedic remake of the 2004 French drama Intimate Strangers for Paramount Pictures. One of her scripts, Ticket to Ride, caught the attention of Ghostbusters director Ivan Reitman. He bought the script under his The Montecito Picture Company as a directing vehicle for himself. According to Reitman, the script was rewritten at least 15 times. The film was released, under the new title Post Grad and was instead directed by Shrek director Vicky Jenson. Post Grad was released in 2009 to critical and commercial disappointment.

2010s
In 2011 Fremon Craig completed another script titled Besties and sent the script to James L. Brooks. Brooks bought the script and it was announced that Fremon Craig would direct the film and Brooks would serve as a producer and mentor for her first film. No updates were issued for the feature until August 2015, when Hailee Steinfeld was announced to star in the film. Casting continued until October of that same year, with filming commencing that same month. The film was released by STX Entertainment in fall 2016 under its new title The Edge of Seventeen to critical praise and it was a modest financial hit. Fremon Craig kept a series of journals that helped inspire her while writing The Edge of Seventeen. She took some of these journal entries and formed them into the script. For research on the film and script, Fremon Craig went to high schools and hung out with teenagers to better understand what their lives were like. Fremon Craig also provided uncredited rewrites (and was briefly attached as co-screenwriter) for the 2018 Transformers spin-off film, Bumblebee, which also starred Steinfeld.

2020s
Fremon Craig was originally attached as the sole screenwriter for an animated film adaptation of Scooby-Doo for Warner Animation Group. The film, released as Scoob! in 2020, was instead rewritten by Adam Sztykiel, Jack Donaldson, Derek Elliott, Matt Lieberman, Eyal Podell, and Jonathon E. Stewart. Fremon Craig is currently collaborating again with James L. Brooks in the film adaptation of the Judy Blume book Are You There God? It's Me, Margaret.

Upcoming projects
 Are You There God? It's Me, Margaret (2023), a film adaptation of the classic novel for Gracie Films
 Wild Game, a film adaptation of the memoir Wild Game: My Mother, Her Lover, and Me for Chernin Entertainment

Influences
Fremon Craig has cited writer-director John Hughes as an influence on writing The Edge of Seventeen, and has mentioned Christopher Guest, Alexander Payne, Nick Hornby, and David Sedaris as inspirations. She also takes inspiration from Nora Ephron by taking moments of her own life and putting them into her writing. Fremon Craig stated that James L. Brooks is her comedy idol, “there's nobody in the world I love more than Jim Brooks. Like he is the reason I wanted to be a filmmaker."

Unrealized projects
 Intimate Strangers for Paramount Pictures
 A modern-day high school retelling of Cyrano de Bergerac for Level 1
 The Good Life for Fox Searchlight Pictures
 The Best Mistakes for Level 1
 Lovehampton for The CW and Alloy Entertainment
 An untitled pilot for CBS Television Studios and Uppity TV
 Scoob! rewrites for Warner Animation Group and Warner Bros.
 Untitled The Edge of Seventeen web series for YouTube Premium

Personal life
Fremon Craig resides in Los Angeles with her husband and young son. She is a represented by UTA and Kaplan/Perrone.

Filmography

Accolades

Note

References

External links

10 Screenwriters to Watch by Variety

1981 births
Living people
21st-century American screenwriters
21st-century American women writers
American women film directors
American women screenwriters
Film directors from California
Film producers from California
Screenwriters from California
University of California, Irvine alumni
Writers from Whittier, California